Tamerlan Sergeyevich Sikoyev (born 31 August 1976) is a Russian former professional footballer.

Club career
He made his professional debut in the Russian First Division in 1994 for FC Avtodor Vladikavkaz. He played one game in the UEFA Cup 1997–98 for FC Alania Vladikavkaz.

Honours
 Russian Premier League champion: 1995.
 Russian Premier League runner-up: 1996.

References

1976 births
Sportspeople from Vladikavkaz
Living people
Russian footballers
Russia under-21 international footballers
FC Spartak Vladikavkaz players
Russian Premier League players
PFC Spartak Nalchik players
FC Volgar Astrakhan players
Association football forwards
FC Mashuk-KMV Pyatigorsk players